Verwantschapslanden is an umbrella term used by some cultural institutions to refer to countries that were once, either fully or partly, Dutch colonial possessions. Besides the Netherlands itself, the countries that are usually included are: Aruba, Curaçao, Indonesia, Sint Maarten, South Africa, and Suriname. Additionally, under some definitions, this list can also be expanded to include Brazil, Ghana, Guyana, Malaysia, Mauritius, the Republic of China (Taiwan), Sri Lanka, and the United States.

See also
 Commonwealth of Nations
 Community of Portuguese Language Countries
 Dutch Empire
 Organisation internationale de la Francophonie

References 

Dutch Empire